Taofik Adegbite is a Nigerian businessman. He currently serves as the Chief Executive Officer of Marine Platforms Limited and Norwegian Consul General in Nigeria. Adegbite is the first Nigerian to deliver an Offshore Subsea Construction Vessel for the oil and gas sector in Nigeria which is named African Inspiration by the Norwegian government through the first ever shipbuilding contract between a Nigerian company and a Norwegian shipyard.

Education

Adegbite holds a BSc in computer science from the University of Ibadan. He later attended the London School of Economics for a certificate course in Strategy & Organization Management; as well as Harvard Business School OPM 44.

Career
Upon completion of his Bachelor's degree, Adegbite started his career with Agricultural Project Monitoring & Evaluation Unit, ( World Bank Project). He later proceeded to the United Kingdom where he worked with Britain's National Health Service (Hammersmith Hospital) as an Information Technology Engineer. After a  career in the United Kingdom, Adegbite joined Marine Platforms in 2001 and assumed the role of Director of Strategy and Business Development. He has since progressed to become the CEO.

Diplomacy
Adegbite was appointed as the Honorary Consul General for Norway, to promote business partnership between Nigeria and Norway, as well as  bring the advantages of Norway into Nigeria in key areas such as energy, aquaculture and maritime.

Personal life

Adegbite is married with three children.

References

Nigerian businesspeople in the oil industry
Harvard Business School alumni
Nigerian expatriates in the United States
Living people
Nigerian Muslims
Nigerian chief executives
University of Ibadan alumni
Year of birth missing (living people)